Huang Runqiu (born August 1963) is a Chinese geologist and politician currently serving as Minister of Ecology and Environment. He is a member of the Jiusan Society and the third minister from a non-Communist party since the reform and opening-up in late 1970s.

Biography
Huang was born in Changsha, Hunan, in August 1963. After high school, he studied (and obtained bachelor's, master's and doctoral degrees), and then taught, at what is now Chengdu University of Technology (former Chengdu Institute of Technology), becoming the vice-president of Chengdu University of Technology and the director of the State Key Laboratory of Geohazard Prevention and Geoenvironment Protection in November 2001.

In December 2007, he was elected a member of the Standing Committee of the Jiusan Society, one of the eight minor non-Communist parties in China. In January 2018, he was appointed vice chairman of the Sichuan Provincial Committee of the Chinese People's Political Consultative Conference (CPPCC). In January 2014, he was appointed vice chairman of the Standing Committee of the Sichuan People's Congress, he remained in that position until March 2016, when he was transferred to Beijing and appointed as a vice minister of the Ministry of Environmental Protection, which was reshuffled as the Ministry of Ecology and Environment in March 2018. On April 29, 2020, he was elevated to the minister of Ecology and Environment, replacing Li Ganjie. He concurrently serves as the vice chairman of the Jiusan Society since December 2017.

He was a member of the 9th, 10th, 11th National Committee of the Chinese People's Political Consultative Conference. He was a delegate to the 12th National People's Congress. In 2018, he was elected as a member of the 13th Standing Committee of the Chinese People's Political Consultative Conference.

Huang held the presidency position during the 2022 United Nations Biodiversity Conference.

References 

1963 births
Living people
Chengdu University of Technology alumni
Politicians from Changsha
Chinese geologists
Academic staff of Chengdu University of Technology
Delegates to the 12th National People's Congress